Elk Township is one of sixteen townships in Jackson County, Illinois, USA.  As of the 2010 census, its population was 1,907 and it contained 873 housing units.

Geography

Cities, towns, villages
 Dowell
 Elkville

Unincorporated towns
 Hallidayboro at 
(This list is based on USGS data and may include former settlements.)

Adjacent townships
 Tyrone Township, Franklin County (northeast)
 Six Mile Township, Franklin County (east)
 De Soto Township (south)
 Somerset Township (southwest)
 Vergennes Township (west)

Cemeteries
The township contains these eight cemeteries: Davis, Davis Number 1, Dutch Hill, Elkville, Gill, Greer, Rees and Russian Orthodox.

Major highways
  U.S. Route 51

Lakes
 Campbell Lake
 Fox Lake
 Snider Lake

Demographics

School districts
 Du Quoin Community Unit School District 300
 Elverado Community Unit School District 196

Political districts
 Illinois' 12th congressional district
 State House District 115
 State Senate District 58

References
 
 United States Census Bureau 2007 TIGER/Line Shapefiles
 United States National Atlas

External links
 City-Data.com
 Illinois State Archives

Townships in Jackson County, Illinois
Townships in Illinois